Lu Gyi Min Khin Byar is a 2015 Burmese drama film, directed by Nyi Nyi Htun Lwin starring Pyay Ti Oo, Wutt Hmone Shwe Yi and Zin Wine. The film, produced by Lu Swan Kaung Film Production premiered Myanmar on March 20, 2015.

Cast
Pyay Ti Oo as Pyae Sone
Wutt Hmone Shwe Yi as Thiri
Zin Wine as U Myat Min
Nyi Htut Khaung as Zarni
Chan Mi Mi Ko as Su Mon 
Aung Lwin as A Ba Aung
Zaw Oo as A Ba Nyan
Tain Nyunt as A Ba Kan
Maung Maung Myint as A Ba Ba Shin
San San Win as A Phwar Nu
Khin Lay Swe as A Phwar Mya Khin

References

2015 films
2010s Burmese-language films
Burmese drama films
Films shot in Myanmar
2015 drama films